Great Brule (Also known as Bruley, Brewley or Brule) is a settlement on the northern tip of Merasheen Island in Placentia Bay in Newfoundland and Labrador. The first permanent residents in the community were recorded in 1813. The cod fishery was the primary source of employment in Great Brule. Between 1951 and 1956 the community was abandoned and most of the residents relocated to larger centers in Placentia Bay.

See also
List of communities in Newfoundland and Labrador
List of ghost towns in Newfoundland and Labrador

References 
 Smallwood, Joseph R. Encyclopedia of Newfoundland and Labrador, Newfoundland Book Publishers Ltd., 1967, p. 705
 

Ghost towns in Newfoundland and Labrador